Monumento al Divino Salvador del Mundo is a monument located on Plaza El Salvador del Mundo (The Savior of the World Plaza) in San Salvador City, El Salvador. It consists of a statue of Jesus Christ standing on top of a global sphere of planet Earth, placed on top of the tall four-sided concrete base pedestal. It is a landmark located in the country's capital San Salvador. It is a symbol that identifies and represents both El Salvador and Salvadorans throughout the world.

History
The monument was built on a pedestal originally used to decorate the tomb of Manuel Enrique Araujo, the President of El Salvador between 1911 and 1913, and presented by Araujo's family on 26 November 1942 in connection to the first National Eucharistic Congress in San Salvador. The iconic statue of Christ on the globe sphere of planet Earth is part of the Monument to Divino Salvador del Mundo on Plaza El Salvador del Mundo (The Savior of the World Plaza).

The statue was damaged in the 1986 San Salvador earthquake. It was rebuilt and put back in place months after the campaign "Lift up your soul Salvadoran". In front of the plaza, there is a statue lifted in memory of Oscar Arnulfo Romero. On the other side, from that area, it is customary to begin the march of floats during the celebration of the festivities of the city.

Remodelling
The plaza was completely remodeled and entirely upgraded in 2010. As part of the reorganization plan to improve the image of San Salvador, mayor Norman Quijano made the remodeling and renaming of Plaza las Americas, now named Plaza Salvador del Mundo. The renovation work included the complete renovation of sidewalks, the stands and the area of the flags. The image of Christ, placed about 18 m high,  was also revamped with new paint.

Gallery

References

External links

Buildings and structures in San Salvador
Statues of Jesus
Buildings and structures completed in 1942
1942 sculptures
1942 establishments in El Salvador
Maps in art